Seis canciones castellanas is a collection of 6 songs for voice and piano by Spanish Basque composer Jesús Guridi. They were inspired by traditional songs collected by Cesáreo Garda in Candeleda in 1936 for the movie La malquerida (based on the 1913 play of the same title by Jacinto Benavente). Guridi composed film music, but the Spanish Civil War interrupted the production, and the movie was finished only in 1940.

It also got the first prize on a competition arranged by Delegación de Propaganda y Comisión de Festejos del Aniversario de la Liberación de Bilbao in 1939.

The songs were published by Unión musical Española in 1941.

List of songs
Allá arriba en aquella montaña (F minor). Andante con moto — Poco più mosso
¡Sereno! ¡Sereno! (C major). Molto moderato e lugubre
Llámale con el pañuelo (A minor). Allegretto grazioso — Meno mosso — Tempo I
No quiero tus avellanas (A major). Molto calmo e misterioso
Cómo quieres que adivine (G major). Allegro ma non troppo
Mañanita de San Juan (D major). Moderato, molto tranquillo

External Links

Seis canciones castellanas at jesusguridi.com
Richard Stokes. Booklet notes to the Hyperion CD CDA67954, with complete sung texts and English translation

1939 compositions
Compositions by Jesús Guridi
Song cycles